Nathaniel Edwards (March 4, 1892 – ?) was an American Negro league pitcher in the 1910s.

A native of Atlanta, Georgia, Edwards made his Negro leagues debut in 1913 with the Philadelphia Giants. He went on to play for the Lincoln Stars in 1916, and for the Bacharach Giants and the Pennsylvania Red Caps of New York in 1918.

References

External links
Baseball statistics and player information from Baseball-Reference Black Baseball Stats and Seamheads

1892 births
Year of death missing
Place of death missing
Bacharach Giants players
Lincoln Stars (baseball) players
Pennsylvania Red Caps of New York players
Philadelphia Giants players
Baseball outfielders
Baseball players from Atlanta